Lyon's snake-eyed skink (Austroablepharus barrylyoni) is a species of lizard in the family Scincidae. The species is endemic to Queensland in Australia.

Etymology
The specific name, barrylyoni, is in honour of Australian wildlife conservationist Barry Lyon, who is the ranger in charge of the Steve Irwin Wildlife Reserve.

Habitat
The preferred natural habitat of A. barrylyoni is grassland.

Description
Its dorsal body pattern consists of alternating dark and light stripes. The tail is red/orange in adults.

Reproduction
The mode of reproduction of A. barrylyoni is unknown.

References

Further reading
Cogger HG (2014). Reptiles and Amphibians of Australia, Seventh Edition. Clayton, Victoria, Australia: CSIRO Publishing. xxx + 1,033 pp. . (Proablepharus barrylyoni).
Couper PJ, Hoskin CJ, Potter S, Bragg JG, Moritz C (2018). "A new genus to accommodate three skinks currently assigned to Proablepharus (Lacertilia: Scincidae)". Memoirs of the Queensland Museum – Nature 60: 227–231. (Austroablepharus barrylyoni, new combination, p. 230).
Couper PJ, Limpus CJ, McDonald KR, Amey AP (2010). "A new species of Proablepharus (Scincidae: Lygosominae) from Mt Surprise, north-eastern Queensland, Australia". Zootaxa 2433: 62–68. (Proablepharus barrylyoni, new species).
Wilson S, Swan G (2013). A Complete Guide to Reptiles of Australia, Fourth Edition. Sydney: New Holland Publishers. 522 pp. . (Proablepharus barrylyoni).

Skinks of Australia
Reptiles described in 2010
Austroablepharus
Taxobox binomials not recognized by IUCN